Korapat Kirdpan (born 18 December 2000), nicknamed Nanon, is a Thai television actor. He is best known for his leading roles in Senior Secret Love (2016), My Dear Loser (2017), The Gifted (2018), Blacklist (2019), The Gifted: Graduation (2020), Bad Buddy Series (2021) and most recently in  Vice Versa (2022).

Early life and education 
Born in Bangkok, Thailand, Korapat is the son of Thai actor Khunakorn Kirdpan and Poonsuk Kirdpan. He has one younger sister named Pitchaporn Kirdpan. He completed his secondary education at Amatyakul School and is currently studying in acting and directing for cinema from the College of Social Communication Innovation at Srinakharinwirot University.

Career 
Korapat started his acting career at the age of three by appearing in several TV commercials. He made his acting debut in 2014 with the television drama series Hormones 2 where he had a guest role as M. In 2015, he had supporting roles in Ugly Duckling Series: Don't and Love Flight - television programs produced by GMM 25. He also reprised his role as M in Hormones 3.

In 2016, he played a supporting role in Little Big Dream. He would later become known for leading roles in Senior Secret Love: My Lil Boy & My Lil Boy 2 (2016) alongside Kanyawee Songmuang, My Dear Loser: Edge of 17 (2017), The Gifted (2018), and The Gifted: Graduation (2020). 

In 2021, Nanon starred with Pawat Chittsawangdee (Ohm) in the highly successful BL series Bad Buddy. Due of their unrivaled chemistry, he and Pawat has held fan meetings in various countries including South Korea, Taiwan, Hong Kong, Thailand, Vietnam Singapore and Philippines. In December 2022, Nanon Korapat won the Best Theme Song Award for ‘Just Friend?’ (Bad Buddy Series OST) at the 27th Asian TV Awards!

Filmography

Film

Drama/Series

Music video appearances

Online Show

Discography 
Songs

MC

Television 
 20: On Air

Online 
 20: On Air YouTube:Korapat Kirdpan ID

Awards and nominations

References

External links 
 
 
 

2000 births
Korapat Kirdpan
Living people
Korapat Kirdpan
Korapat Kirdpan
Korapat Kirdpan
Korapat Kirdpan
Korapat Kirdpan
Korapat Kirdpan
Korapat Kirdpan
Korapat Kirdpan
Korapat Kirdpan